Louis I, Duke of Anjou (23 July 1339 – 20 September 1384) was a French prince, the second son of John II of France and Bonne of Bohemia.  His career was markedly unsuccessful.  Born at the Château de Vincennes, Louis was the first of the Angevin branch of the French royal house. His father appointed him Count of Anjou and Count of Maine in 1356, and then raised him to the title Duke of Anjou in 1360 and Duke of Touraine in 1370.

He fought in the Battle of Poitiers (1356), in which his father the king was captured by the English. In 1360, he was one of a group of hostages the French surrendered to the English in exchange for the king. He escaped from England, after which his father felt bound in honour to return to English custody, where he later died.

In 1382, as the adopted son of Joanna I of Naples, he succeeded to the counties of Provence and Forcalquier. He also inherited from her a claim to the kingdoms of Naples and Jerusalem. He was already a veteran of the Hundred Years' War against the English when he led an army into Italy to claim his Neapolitan inheritance. He died on the march and his claims and titles fell to his son and namesake, Louis II, who succeeded in ruling Naples for a time.

Hundred Years' War
Louis was present at the Battle of Poitiers (1356), in the battalion commanded by his brother Charles, the Dauphin. They hardly fought and the whole group escaped in the middle of the confrontation. Although humiliating, their flight allowed them to avoid capture by the English, who won the battle decisively. King John II and Louis' younger brother Philip were not so fortunate and were captured by the English, commanded by Edward, the Black Prince. Their ransom and peace conditions between France and England were agreed in the Treaty of Brétigny, signed in 1360. Amongst the complicated items of the treaty was a clause that determined the surrender of 40 high-born hostages as guarantee for the payment of the king's ransom. Louis, already Duke of Anjou, was in this group and sailed to England in October 1360. However, France was not in good economic condition and further installments of the debt were delayed. As consequence, Louis was in English custody for much more than the expected six months. He tried to negotiate his freedom in a private negotiation with Edward III of England and, when this failed, decided to escape. On his return to France, he met his father's disapproval for his unknightly behavior. John II considered himself dishonored and this, combined with the fact that his ransom payments agreed to in the Treaty of Brétigny were in arrears, caused John to return to captivity in England to redeem his honor.

From 1380 to 1382 Louis served as regent for his nephew, King Charles VI of France.

King of Naples
In 1382 Louis left France in the latter year to claim the throne of Naples following the death of Queen Joanna I. She had adopted him to succeed her, as she was childless and did not wish to leave her inheritance to any of her close relatives, whom she considered enemies. He was also able to succeed her as count of Provence and Forcalquier. Despite his coronation at Avignon as King of Naples by Antipope Clement VII, Louis was forced to remain in France and Joan's troops were defeated by Charles of Durazzo, her second cousin and previous heir. Joanna was killed in her prison in San Fele in 1382; Louis, with support of the Antipope, France, Bernabò Visconti of Milan and Amadeus VI of Savoy, and using the money he had been able to obtain during the regency, launched an expedition to regain the Kingdom of Naples from Charles.

The expedition, counting to some 40,000 troops, was however unsuccessful. Charles, who counted on the mercenary companies under John Hawkwood for a total of some 14,000 men, was able to divert the French from Naples to other regions of the kingdom and to harass them with guerrilla tactics. Amadeus fell ill and died in Molise on 1 March 1383 and his troops abandoned the field. Louis asked for help from his king nephew in France, who sent him an army under Enguerrand of Coucy. The latter was able to conquer Arezzo and then invade the Kingdom of Naples, but midway was reached by the news that Louis had suddenly died at Bisceglie on 20 September 1384. He soon sold Arezzo to Florence and returned to France.

Marriage and children
On 9 July 1360, he married Marie of Blois, Lady of Guise, daughter of Charles, Duke of Brittany and Joanna of Dreux. They had the following children:
 Marie (1370 – after 1383)
 Louis II of Anjou (1377 – 1417)
Charles (1380 – 1404, Angers), Prince of Taranto, Count of Roucy, Étampes, and Gien

Ancestors

References

Sources

|-

|-

|-

1339 births
1384 deaths
14th-century peers of France
14th-century monarchs of Naples
Heirs presumptive to the French throne
People from Vincennes
Military governors of Paris
House of Valois-Anjou
Claimant Kings of Jerusalem
Regents
Dukes of Touraine
Dukes of Anjou
Dukes of Calabria
Counts of Anjou
Counts of Maine
Counts of Provence
Counts of Forcalquier
Counts of Piedmont
Counts of Étampes
Counts of Roucy
French prisoners of war in the Hundred Years' War
Sons of kings